Adele Jackson is an Australian Paralympic lawn bowler. At the 1976 Toronto Games, she competed in two events and won a gold medal in the Women's Pairs B with Charmaine Smith.

References

External links 
 

Lawn bowls players at the 1976 Summer Paralympics
Paralympic gold medalists for Australia
Living people
Paralympic lawn bowls players of Australia
Australian female bowls players
Year of birth missing (living people)
Medalists at the 1976 Summer Paralympics
Paralympic medalists in lawn bowls
20th-century Australian women